Etgar is a Jewish given name and surname. Notable people with the name include:

Etgar Keret (born 1967), Israeli writer 
Raphie Etgar (born 1947), Israeli artist and curator

See also
Edgar

Jewish surnames